The Ministry of Social Affairs of Estonia is a government ministry of Estonia responsible for social policies of the country.

List of Ministers
The position first appeared in the government of Mart Laar established in 1992. In 2014, the responsibilities of the Minister of Social Affairs were divided between the two newly established positions of Minister of Social Protection and Minister of Health and Labour.

Minister of Social Affairs (1992–2014)
22 October 1992 – 20 September 1994 Marju Lauristin.
20 September 1994 – 1 May 1995 Toomas Vilosius.
17 April 1995 – 20 November 1995 Siiri Oviir.
6 November 1995 – 1 December 1996 Toomas Vilosius.
2 December 1996 – 25 March 1999 Tiiu Aro.
25 March 1999 – 28 January 2002 Eiki Nestor.
28 January 2002 – 9 April 2003 Siiri Oviir.
10 April 2003 – 13 April 2005 Marko Pomerants.
13 April 2005 – 5 April 2007 Jaak Aab.
5 April 2007 – 23 February 2009 Maret Maripuu.
23 February 2009 – 10 December 2012 Hanno Pevkur.
11 December 2012 – 26 March 2014 Taavi Rõivas

Minister of Social Protection (2014–2019)
26 March 2014 – 30 March 2015 Helmen Kütt
9 April 2015 – 23 November 2016 Margus Tsahkna
23 November 2016 – 29 April 2019 Kaia Iva

Minister of Health and Labour (2014–2019)
26 March 2014 – 30 March 2015 Urmas Kruuse
9 April 2015 – 14 September 2015 Rannar Vassiljev
14 September 2015 – 2 May 2018 Jevgeni Ossinovski
2 May 2018 – 29 April 2019 Riina Sikkut

Minister of Social Affairs (2019–2021) 
29 April 2019 – 26 January 2021 Tanel Kiik

Minister of Health and Labour (2021–present) 

 26 January 2021 – 3 June 2022 Tanel Kiik
 18 July 2022 – present Peep Peterson

Minister of Social Protection (2021–present) 

 26 January 2021 – present Signe Riisalo

References

External links
Official website

Social Affairs